La Garita is an unincorporated community in Saguache County, in the U.S. state of Colorado.

History
A post office called La Garita operated intermittently from 1874 until 1972. The community takes its name from the nearby La Garita Mountains.

References

Unincorporated communities in Saguache County, Colorado
Unincorporated communities in Colorado